Barking & East Ham United FC was a football club that formed in 2001 after the merger of Barking and East Ham United. The club initially played in Division One of the Isthmian League, and then Division One North after league reorganisation in 2002. In 2004 they transferred to Division One East of the Southern League. In 2005–06 they finished fifth and qualified for the play-offs, but lost 3–2 to Stamford. The club was then transferred back to Division One North of the Isthmian League, but resigned from the league on 19 June and folded. One of the two clubs from which Barking & East Ham United were formed, Barking reformed for the 2006–07 season and currently play in the Isthmian League.

References

Association football clubs established in 2001
Association football clubs disestablished in 2006
Defunct football clubs in England
Sport in the London Borough of Barking and Dagenham
Sport in the London Borough of Newham
Defunct football clubs in London
Isthmian League
Southern Football League clubs
2001 establishments in England
2006 disestablishments in England